Kielmeyera speciosa is a species of Kielmeyera from Brazil.

References

External links
 
 

speciosa
Flora of Brazil